Sankt Johann im Saggautal is a municipality in the district of Leibnitz in the Austrian state of Styria.

Geography
Sankt Johann im Saggautal lies on the Eichberg in southern Styria.

References

Cities and towns in Leibnitz District